The Gippsland Power is an Australian rules football team in the NAB League, the top statewide under-18 competition in Victoria, Australia.

Honours
Premierships (1): 2005
Runners-up (3): 1999, 2010, 2012
Wooden Spoons (1): 2003
Morrish Medallists: Matthew Stolarczyk (1999), Jarryd Blair (2008), Dyson Heppell (2010), Nick Graham (2012), Josh Scott (2013), Alex Carr (2014)
TAC Cup Coach Award winners: Jason McFarlane (1994), Steven Hazelman (1998), Leigh Brown (1999), Shaun Marusic (2011)
Grand Final Best-on-Ground Medalists: Dale Thomas (2005)

Draftees
1993: Mark Stevens, Craig Biddiscombe, Ben Robbins
1994: Robert McMahon, Tim Elliott
1995: N/A
1996: Brett Knowles, Matthew Watson
1997: Callum Chambers, Greg Tivendale, Brent Cowell
1998: Damien Adkins, David Wojcinski, Adrian Cox
1999: Leigh Brown, Robert Murphy
2000: Luke Ablett, Shane Birss, Dylan McLaren
2001: Jason Gram, Jacob Schuback
2002: Brendon Goddard, Jason Winderlich, Matthew Ferguson, Sean Dempster
2003: Ryan Murphy
2004: Jarryd Roughead, Andrew McQualter, Dean Polo
2005: Dale Thomas, Xavier Ellis, Scott Pendlebury, Trent West, Jay Neagle
2006: Lachlan Hansen, Tyson Goldsack, Brent Macaffer
2007: N/A
2008: Nick Heyne, Campbell Heath, Jarryd Blair
2009: John Butcher, Koby Stevens, Nathan Vardy
2010: Dyson Heppell, Jed Lamb, Michael Ross, Tomas Bugg
2011: Sam Docherty, Clay Smith, Josh Tynan
2012: Nick Graham, Will Hams, Tim Membrey
2013: Jack Leslie
2014: Jordan Cunico, Lukas Webb
2015: Harry McKay, Ben McKay, Josh Dunkley, Sam Skinner, Tom Papley, Anthony McDonald-Tipungwuti
2016: Ben Ainsworth
2017: Callum Porter, Changkuoth Jiath
2018: Irving Mosquito, Noah Gown
2019: Caleb Serong, Sam Flanders, Charlie Comben, Brock Smith, Leo Connolly, Fraser Phillips, Harry Pepper
2020: Zach Reid, Ryan Angwin, Sam Berry

External links
 Gippsland Power home page

NAB League clubs
1993 establishments in Australia
Australian rules football clubs established in 1993
Australian rules football clubs in Victoria (Australia)
NAB League Girls clubs
Morwell, Victoria